Henry Gibson Bauld (July 26, 1859 – February 3, 1948) was a merchant and political figure in Nova Scotia, Canada. He represented Halifax County in the Nova Scotia House of Assembly from 1916 to 1925 as a Liberal member.

He was born in Halifax, the son of William Bauld and Emily Grey. In 1882, he married Margaret Edith Duncan. Bauld was a director of Halifax Fire Insurance Company and the Merchants' Bank of Halifax. He was also president of the Nova Scotia Home for Coloured Children in Preston. Bauld died in Halifax at the age of 88.

References 
 A Directory of the Members of the Legislative Assembly of Nova Scotia, 1758-1958, Public Archives of Nova Scotia (1958)

1859 births
1948 deaths
Nova Scotia Liberal Party MLAs